The siddur and macḥzor are the two principal types of Jewish prayer books.  In particular:

 Siddur, from a Hebrew root meaning "order," refers to the prayer book generally used through the course of the year.  The "complete" siddur will contain prayers for weekdays and Shabbat, for lifecycle events like weddings and circumcisions, and for most major and minor Jewish holidays.  Less than "complete" editions, such as weekday-only or Shabbat-only siddurim, can also be found readily.
 Machzor (also maḥzor or mahzor), from a Hebrew root meaning "cycle", refers to prayer books containing the prayers for the major holidays of the year.  
This term is most often encountered as referring to prayer books for the High Holy Days, Rosh Hashanah and Yom Kippur.  The unique prayers of these days are so extensive that they are almost never found in standard siddurim.

There are also maḥzorim for the Three Pilgrimage Festivals, Passover, Shavuot and Sukkot, although prayers for those days can also be found in the standard siddur.  Note that the term machzor originally referred to a book containing prayers for the entire year, including weekdays and Shabbat as well as holidays.
Other books exist for specialized Jewish prayer purposes:
  Tanakh, the bible ("ta"=torah), prophets("na"= nevi'im"  ,and writings ( kh= ketuvim).
  Tehillim, psalms -attributed to King David, people say chapters or perakim, for any occasion, during prayer or trouble.     
 Selichot, containing the penitential prayers said on fast days and during the period around the High Holy Days.
 Kinot, containing the prayers of mourning recited on the fast of Tisha B'av.
 Birchon, widely known by its Yiddish name "bentscher", a small book appropriate for use at the table containing the Birkat HaMazon, Grace after Meals, and frequently other prayers and songs recited at a Shabbat or holiday table such as Kiddush and Zemirot.
 Haggadah, the service read at the Passover seder.

References 

 Lindsay Jones, ed. (December 2004), Encyclopedia of Religion (2 ed.), Macmillan Reference USA,

External links
  A Historical Map of Jewish Liturgical Influence and Variation

Jewish prayer books